Charles William David Mesure (born 12 August 1970) is an English Australian actor known for his work in Australia, New Zealand and the United States of America.

Birth and education
Mesure was born in Somerset, England. When he was five, his family moved to Australia and he grew up in Sydney. Mesure attended Newington College (1982–1987) and graduated from the National Institute of Dramatic Art, Australia, with a degree in Performing Arts (Acting) in 1995.

Career
In 1995, he moved to New Zealand where he soon picked up a few acting roles. Mesure has acted in, directed, designed, and written upwards of thirty productions for Sydney University's Drama Society while studying law. 

In 1998, he was nominated for a Best Actor New Zealand Television Award for his work as Ryan Waters on the New Zealand soap opera, City Life.

In 2003, he won the Best Supporting Actor award for his work as Kees Van Damm on the New Zealand drama, Street Legal. Mesure appeared as a supporting character in Season 1 of the American TV series V, and was promoted to a regular series cast member for Season 2.

Mesure is known internationally for his role as Kyle Hobbes in the 2009 re-imagining of V and the archangel Michael in both the TV series Hercules: The Legendary Journeys and Xena: Warrior Princess. He has played guest roles on hit shows such as Lost, Without a Trace, Bones and Stacked. Mesure had a recurring role as the reporter JD Pollack on Crossing Jordan. He appeared in such feature films as Boogeyman,  Mee Shee: The Water Giant, and Superfire.

In 2009, he played Detective-Sergeant Zane Gerard in the New Zealand drama Outrageous Fortune.

In 2010, he played Alec Ross, the lead character in Television New Zealand's new drama series, This Is Not My Life. He joined the final season cast of Desperate Housewives as Ben Faulkner, a contractor who shares a connection with Renee Perry (Vanessa Williams). He made a guest appearance on a 2013 episode of Burn Notice, playing the head of a criminal hacking syndicate.

On 30 March 2014, he played Edwin MacKaye in the episode called "Violets" on The Mentalist. From 2014 to 2018 he guest-starred in five episodes of Once Upon a Time, as the pirate Blackbeard.

Filmography

Film

Television

References

External links

 
 

1970 births
Australian male film actors
Australian male television actors
Australian male writers
Australian people of English descent
Living people
People educated at Newington College
National Institute of Dramatic Art alumni
People from Somerset